Get Me Some is an album by The Jeff Healey Band. Their fifth and final album, it was released in 2000.

Track listing

Production
The Jeff Healey Band - Producer
Tom Stephen - Executive Producer
Arnold Lanni - Producer
Marti Frederiksen - Digital Editing, Producer
Jim Scott - Engineer, Mixing
Richard Chycki - Digital Editing, Engineer, Mixing
Greg Calbi - Mastering
Garnet Armstrong - Art Direction
Ken Johnson - Art Direction
Margaret Malandruccolo - Photography

Personnel 
The Jeff Healey Band
Jeff Healey - vocals, electric guitar, acoustic guitar, piano
Joe Rockman - bass guitar
Tom Stephen - drums, percussion

Additional Musicians
Richard Chycki- rhythm guitar, percussion
Marti Frederiksen - guitar, twelve-string guitar, percussion, background vocals
Arnold Lanni - guitar
Lou Pomanti - keyboards, piano
Philip Sayce - guitar
Benmont Tench - keyboards

References 

2000 albums
The Jeff Healey Band albums
Albums produced by Arnold Lanni